The North Stradbroke Island Historical Museum is a museum founded in 1987 to present the history of North Stradbroke Island.  It is found at 15-17 Welsby Street, in Dunwich on North Stradbroke Island.  The museum comprises four buildings: the Dunwich Benevolent Asylum, the main building, the Herdsman's Hut, and a replica of the first Dunwich Post Office.  The museum also contains archives with local documents and images.

The museum contains the following exhibits:
Aboriginal Room
Pioneer Room
Lighthouse
Shipping
Whale Skull (on loan from the Queensland Museum)

References

External links 
 North Stradbroke Island Historical Museum website

Museums in Queensland
Local museums in Australia
Maritime museums in Australia
North Stradbroke Island
Buildings and structures in Redland City